Hennadiy Valentynovych Avdyeyenko (born November 4, 1963 in Odessa) is a retired high jumper who represented the USSR and later Ukraine. He trained at the Armed Forces sports society in Odessa. He won gold medals at both the Olympics and the World Championships.

Career
Avdyeyenko entered the 1983 World Championships as an unknown. His personal best was only 2.25 m and he had placed 6th at the main tryout meeting, the 1983 Spartakiad; however, high jump coach Kęstutis Šapka and team coach Igor Ter-Ovanesyan lobbied to have him included in the team. In the World Championship final, up against thirteen athletes with bests of 2.30 m or better, Avdyeyenko improved his personal best by 7 centimetres to win an unexpected gold medal, beating the United States' Tyke Peacock on countback.

Avdyeyenko placed second at the 1987 World Indoor Championships in Indianapolis, jumping a new personal best (and Soviet indoor record) of 2.38 m but losing to teammate Igor Paklin in a jump-off. He won another silver medal at the outdoor championships that year, again jumping 2.38 m and tying with Paklin; this time the tie did not have to be broken, as Patrik Sjöberg won on countback and the gold medal was thus not at stake.

Avdyeyenko then won another gold at the 1988 Summer Olympics in Seoul, in the absence of Cuba's world record holder Javier Sotomayor, whose country boycotted the Olympics. He jumped 2.38 m yet again, and this time he was the only jumper to clear that height.

Avdyeyenko graduated from Odessa Polytechnic Institute and worked as an expert in refrigerating equipment.

Major achievements

References

External links

1963 births
Athletes (track and field) at the 1988 Summer Olympics
Ukrainian male high jumpers
Soviet male high jumpers
Living people
Armed Forces sports society athletes
Olympic athletes of the Soviet Union
Olympic gold medalists for the Soviet Union
Sportspeople from Odesa
World Athletics Championships medalists
Olympic gold medalists in athletics (track and field)
World Athletics Indoor Championships medalists
World Athletics Championships winners
Medalists at the 1988 Summer Olympics
K. D. Ushinsky South Ukrainian National Pedagogical University alumni